The term coalition of the willing refers to an international alliance focused on achieving a particular objective, usually of military or political nature.

Usage
One early use was by President Bill Clinton in June 1994 in relation to possible operations against North Korea, at the height of the 1994 stand-off with that country over nuclear weapons.

Coalition of the willing referred to the US-led Multi-National Force – Iraq, the military command during the 2003 invasion of Iraq and much of the ensuing Iraq War. The coalition was led by the United States.

It has also been applied to the Australian-led INTERFET operation in East Timor.

References

Political catchphrases